Why Rock the Boat? is a 1974 Canadian romantic comedy film directed by John Howe. The film stars Stuart Gillard as Harry Barnes, a young journalist in Montreal who becomes romantically involved with Julia Martin (Tiiu Leek), a reporter for a competing newspaper who is organizing to unionize their industry.

The film's cast also includes Henry Beckman, Sean Sullivan, Cec Linder, Maurice Podbrey, Patricia Hamilton, Jean-Pierre Masson and Peter MacNeill.

The screenplay was written by journalist and humorist William Weintraub, as an adaptation of his own comic novel. Notably, he dropped the novel's most famous scene, which took place in a nudist colony, due to concerns that the scene would cause problems for the film's content rating.

The film received two Canadian Film Awards in 1975, for Best Actor (Gillard) and Best Supporting Actor (Beckman). It was a nominee for Best Feature Film, but did not win. It won the Bronze Hugo at the 1974 Chicago International Film Festival.

Production
The film had a budget of $450,000.

References

Works cited

External links
 

1974 films
1974 romantic comedy films
Canadian romantic comedy films
English-language Canadian films
Films set in Montreal
National Film Board of Canada films
Films about journalists
Films based on Canadian novels
Films directed by John Howe (director)
1970s English-language films
1970s Canadian films